Miss USA 1981 was the 30th Miss USA pageant, televised live on May 21, 1981 from the Gulf Coast Convention Center in Biloxi, Mississippi on CBS.

The pageant was won by Kim Seelbrede of Ohio, who was crowned by outgoing titleholder Jineane Ford of Arizona.  Seelbrede was the second woman from Ohio to win the Miss USA title, and went on to place as a semi-finalist in Miss Universe 1981. 

The 1981 pageant featured only 50 delegates after Deborah Fountain of New York was disqualified during the preliminary judging after being found to have padded her swimsuit. The final question that was asked by each of the Top Five delegates was "Your sister or best friend has been chosen for the Miss USA 1982 and she came to you for advice what would you tell her?"

This year marked the first year since 1957 a runner-up of Miss USA was sent to Miss World, this would continue until 1991 when the Miss World Organization stop accepting Runner-Ups from Miss USA, due to MUO refusing to make a public announcement during the pageant. Between 1958-1980, a separate pageant determined the US representatives at Miss World.

Results

Final Competition

Special awards

(Kerby is the only Miss USA delegate to have won both special awards)

Historical significance of Miss USA 1981 
 Ohio wins competition for the second time.
 Indiana earns the 1st runner-up position for the first time and surpasses its previous highest placement in 1966, becoming its highest position ever at the contest.
 Louisiana earns the 2nd runner-up position for the first time.
 California earns the 3rd runner-up position for the fifth time. The last time it placed this was in 1977.
 Hawaii earns the 4th runner-up position for the first time.
 States that placed in semifinals the previous year were Alabama, Arizona, Maryland and Texas.
 Texas placed for the seventh consecutive year.
 Arizona placed for the third consecutive year.
 Alabama and Maryland made their second consecutive placement.
 California, Hawaii and Virginia last placed in 1979.
 Indiana last placed in 1978.
 Georgia last placed in 1977.
 Louisiana last placed in 1976.
 Ohio last placed in 1972.
 Tennessee last placed in 1970.
 New York breaks an ongoing streak of placements since 1979.

Delegates
The Miss USA 1981 delegates were:

 Alabama - JoAnne Henderson
 Alaska - Shelley Brunaugh
 Arizona - Cassie Hill
 Arkansas - Lynnanne Derryberry
 California - Cynthia Kerby
 Colorado - Shannon Davidson
 Connecticut - Kelly Thompson
 Delaware - Natalie Ramsey
 District of Columbia - Belinda Johnson
 Florida - Valerie Lundeen
 Georgia - Lisa Condre
 Hawaii - Teri Ann Linn
 Idaho - Lori Ditch
 Illinois - Leslie Renfrow
 Indiana - Holli Dennis
 Iowa - Jennifer Lynn Wimpey
 Kansas - Missy Kaser
 Kentucky - Denise Gibbs
 Louisiana - Lisa Moss
 Maine - Judy Lynn Footer
 Maryland - Linda Lambert
 Massachusetts - JoAnn Savery
 Michigan - Karen Eidson
 Minnesota - Polly Peterson
 Mississippi - Angela Ashmore
 Missouri - Karyn Smagacz
 Montana - Cathi Jo Locati
 Nebraska - Ladonna Hill
 Nevada - Mary Lebsock
 New Hampshire - Cynthia Lee Graves
 New Jersey - Christy Garthwaite
 New Mexico - Lise Gabrielle Dominique Thevenet
 New York - Deborah Fountain (disqualified)
 North Carolina - Lisa Colleen Swift
 North Dakota - Laurie Saarinen
 Ohio - Kim Seelbrede
 Oklahoma - Stacey Loach
 Oregon - Dawn Lewis
 Pennsylvania - Nena Stone
 Rhode Island - Patti Reo
 South Carolina - Zade Turner
 South Dakota - Joan Abbott
 Tennessee - Sharon Kay Steakley
 Texas - Diana Durnford
 Utah - Tonya Anderson
 Vermont - Jeannette Wulff
 Virginia - Pam Hutchens
 Washington - Leila Wagner
 West Virginia - Kelly Carr
 Wisconsin - Dawn Marie Spreeman
 Wyoming - Deborah Aspinwall

Judges
Cindy Adams, American gossip columnist and writer
Joey Adams, American comedian
Dwight Clark
Jim Fowler, zoologist and host of television show Mutual of Omaha's Wild Kingdom
Mary Therese Friel, Miss USA 1979
Gary Graffman, pianist
Phil Roura, Editor of People Page, NY Daily News

References

External links 
 

1981
May 1981 events in the United States
1981 in Mississippi
1981 beauty pageants
1981